Axion is a brand of dishwashing liquid product marketed by Colgate-Palmolive. It is available in Asia and Latin America.

History
Since 1968-03-18, Colgate's brand, Axion was the name of an enzyme pre-soak, used before laundering.

See also
 Palmolive - a similar dishwashing liquid produced by C-P for the U.S., Canada and other markets.
 Axion - a hypothetical fundamental particle whose name was inspired by the detergent.

References

Colgate-Palmolive brands
Cleaning products